The 2017 NCAA National Collegiate Women's Water Polo Championship was the 17th annual tournament to decide the championship of NCAA women's collegiate water polo. Two play-in games were held on May 6, with the winners advancing to the main tournament, May 12-14 at Indiana University Natatorium in Indianapolis, Indiana, hosted by IUPUI. Stanford defeated UCLA 8-7 to win its third national championship in four years.

Qualification
The tournament is open to all programs from Divisions I, II, and III. Ten teams will participate in the tournament, with the champions of the Big West Conference, Collegiate Water Polo Association, Golden Coast Conference, Metro Atlantic Athletic Conference, Mountain Pacific Sports Federation, Southern California Intercollegiate Athletic Conference, and Western Water Polo Association earning automatic bids. Three teams were selected at large.

Opening round
May 6, 2017

Tournament bracket
May 12-14 at Indiana University Natatorium, Indianapolis, Indiana

All Tournament Team

TBA

References

NCAA Women's Water Polo Championship
NCAA Women's Water Polo Championship
NCAA Women's Water Polo
May 2017 sports events in the United States
2017